Congo Premier League is the top division of the Congolese Football Federation. The competition was created in 1961.
A total of 18 teams will contest the league in 2013.

Teams
AC Léopards (Dolisie)
AS Chéminots (Pointe-Noire)
AS Ponténégrine (Pointe-Noire)
CARA Brazzaville (Brazzaville)
CS La Mancha (Pointe-Noire)
CSMD Diables Noirs (Brazzaville)
Étoile du Congo (Brazzaville)
FC Bilombé (Pointe-Noire)
FC Cuvette (Brazzaville)
FC Kondzo (Brazzaville)
Inter Club (Brazzaville)
JS Talangaï (Brazzaville)
Muni Sport  (Pointe-Noire)
Nico-Nicoyé (Pointe-Noire)
Patronage Sainte-Anne (Brazzaville)
Saint Michel de Ouenzé (Brazzaville)
Tongo FC Jambon (Brazzaville)
US Saint Pierre  (Pointe-Noire)

League table
AC Léopards                 87
Diables Noirs               77
Kondzo                      61
CARA Brazzaville            60
AS Chéminots                54
JS Talangaï                 52 
Nico-Nicoyé                 50
Étoile du Congo             45
Saint Michel d'Ouenzé       44
Tongo FC Jambon             44
FC Bilombé                  43
CS La Mancha                40
Patronage Sainte-Anne       39
AS Ponténégrine             36
FC Cuvette                  30 
Inter Club Brazzaville      29
Munisport de Pointe-Noire   27 
US Saint Pierre             15

References

External links
Soccerway

Football competitions in the Republic of the Congo
2013 in the Republic of the Congo sport